Port Lihou Island or Yeta (Yœtha beard) is an island in the Torres Strait, in Queensland's north between the Australian mainland and Papua New Guinea.

Since May 2001, the Kaurareg people have held the native title rights to most of the island.

Yeta is the name given by the Muralag/Kaurareg people. Its English name of Port Lihou was given by Lieutenant John Lihou, R.N., in 1823.

Lihou, then Master of the merchant ship Zenobia, was on passage from Manila to South America and had chosen a route through Torres Strait. This was the first occasion a ship was navigated through Torres Strait from west to east. It was also the first occasion a ship was navigated through the Coral Sea from Torres Strait, south-eastward  to the south-ward of New Caledonia.

The Zenobia entered Endeavour Strait in January 1823, and discovered a shallow port on the south coast of Prince of Wales Island, subsequently named Port Lihou.

See also
Torres Strait Islands

References

Torres Strait Islands
Islands of Far North Queensland
Islands of Queensland